Ōura, Oura or Ooura is a Japanese surname. Notable people with the surname include:

, Japanese water polo player
, Japanese politician and bureaucrat
, Japanese businesswoman
, Japanese volleyball player and coach
, Japanese conductor

Japanese-language surnames